The Niagara-on-the-Lake Predators are a Canadian junior ice hockey team based in Niagara-on-the-Lake, Ontario, Canada. They play in the Greater Metro Junior A Hockey League (GMHL).

History

The Toronto Predators joined the GMHL as an expansion franchise in February 2013. Founded by Allan Donnan, the Predators called the historic Maple Leaf Gardens (now known as Mattamy Athletic Center) home.

The Predators played their first game on September 7, 2013, at home, against the Orangeville Americans. Hockey Hall of Famers Ken Dryden and Darryl Sittler, and singer John McDermott did the opening puck drop, as the Americans won the game 4–2. Mitch Hebert scored the first goal in team history, just five seconds into the game, while goaltender Marc Villeneuve made 49 saves in a losing effort. On September 28, 2013, Robin Bonvin scored in overtime to give the Predators their first franchise victory. Playing on home ice, Marc Villeneuve made 58 saves in net, against the Knights of Meaford, in the 3–2 victory. Mitch Hebert scored a franchise record four goals on October 27, 2013, against the Powassan Eagles. Hebert was the first Predator to notch a hat trick.

After their inaugural season the Predators were taken over by Robert Turnbull. A longtime Hamilton Red Wings (1999–2014) general manager and team president, Turnbull took over from previous owner Allan Donnan (who also owned the Toronto Attack). Before the 2017–18 season, the Predators had relocated home games to Canlan Ice Sports – York in North York.

Following the 2020–21 season that was cancelled due to the COVID-19 pandemic, the team relocated to Niagara-on-the-Lake for the 2021–22 season.

Season-by-season standings

References

External links
Torono Predators website

2013 establishments in Ontario
Ice hockey clubs established in 2013
Ice hockey teams in Toronto
Niagara-on-the-Lake